Sona may refer to: 
 State of the Nation Address

Places
Sona, Veneto, a comune in the province of Verona in Italy
Soná District, Veraguas, a district within the Province of Veraguas, situated in Panama
Soná, Panama, a town in Soná District, Veraguas, Panama.
Șona, a commune located in Alba County, Romania.
Sona Glacier, a Himalayan glacier situated in the eastern part of Uttarakhand in the Pithoragarh district of India
Sona, Norway, a village in the municipality of Stjørdal in Trøndelag county, Norway
Sona Station, a railway station on the Meråker Line in the village of Sona
Sona Mosque, a mosque in Chapai Nawabganj district of Bangladesh
Sona College of Technology, a college in Salem, Tamil Nadu, India

Organizations 

 Society of Nepali Architects

Persons
 Sona (given name), a list of people with this name
 SONA (singer)

Film and television
Sona Chandi, comedy-drama television serial produced by Pakistan Television Corporation
Sona Spa, 2013 Hindi Drama film
Kala Sona, 1975 action thriller Hindi film
Chandi Sona, 1977 Hindi film
"Sona", episode 22 of season 2 of Prison Break

Music
SonaBLAST! Records, a Louiseville, KY based record label 
SONA (band), Neo-Pagan folk rock American music band
Sona Family, London-based musical quartet

Others
[SONA] State Of The Nation Address
Lusona (plural sona), African ideographic tradition
Sona language (artificial), worldlang created by Kenneth Searight and described in a book he published in 1935
Sona language (Papua New Guinea), Kanasi language of Papua New Guinea
Sona Masuri, medium-grain rice grown largely in the Indian states of Andhra Pradesh and Karnataka
 State of the Nation (disambiguation)